Jennifer Byrne Presents is an Australian spinoff series of specials from the First Tuesday Book Club presented by ABC journalist Jennifer Byrne. The show first aired on the ABC TV on 9 October 2007. The program is broadcast on selected Tuesdays at 10:00pm and is replayed at 4:30pm on the following Sunday.

Episode List

2012

2011

2010

2009

2008

2007

See also 
 First Tuesday Book Club
 List of Australian television series

References

External links 
 

Australian television talk shows
Television shows about books and literature
Australian Broadcasting Corporation original programming
2007 Australian television series debuts
2010s Australian television series